War Elephant is the debut album by Deer Tick. It was originally released September 4, 2007 on FEOW! Records. After parting ways with their label, Deer Tick continued touring without a repress of the album they were supporting. Partisan Records re-released War Elephant on November 11, 2008.

Track listing
All songs written by John McCauley, except for where noted.
 "Ashamed" (2:15)
 "Art Isn't Real (City of Sin)" (2:50)
 "Standing at the Threshold" (2:28)
 "Dirty Dishes" (3:19)
 "Long Time" (3:47)
 "Nevada" (2:47)
 "Baltimore Blues No. 1" (3:02)
 "These Old Shoes" (Chris Paddock) (2:21)
 "Not So Dense" (4:23)
 "Spend the Night" (2:29)
 "Diamond Rings 2007" (4:42)
 "Sink or Swim" (4:55)
 "Christ Jesus" (5:20)
 "What Kind of Fool Am I?" (Leslie Bricusse, Anthony Newley) (3:33)

References 

2007 debut albums
Deer Tick (band) albums
Partisan Records albums